Traill International School, Bangkok is a school in Bang Kapi District, Bangkok, Thailand.

Established in 1966, it has an enrollment of approximately 500 students ranging from Pre - Kindergarten to Sixth Form. The standardised British National Curriculum (England, Wales and Northern Ireland) is followed by all year groups in the school.

History
Traill School was founded in 1966 by Mr and Mrs Anthony Traill, although back then it was called The Preparatory School.

It was the very first British Secondary School in Thailand, with an initial student roll of only 82.

Houses
Traill International School has three houses whose names were chosen approximately 20 years ago to represent  cross-cultural  legendary creatures attributed with intelligence, strength, courage, ambition and fortitude. Characteristics which are regularly demonstrated by their students. Students throughout the school compete in events and challenges throughout the school year ranging from sporting to good citizenship. A special emphasis is placed on events that stimulate the student’s minds and are designed to provide opportunities that challenge each student. Students are awarded points for participating, as well as winning, and these contribute to the overall cross campus total of the Houses. The House system fosters in the students a strong sense of teamwork and develops character in the students, which will stay with them for the rest of their lives. Year after year  older students  encourage and support the younger children in whatever activity they are engaged in, much like an extended family.

At the end of school year assembly the Interhouse Cup is presented to the House who has accumulated the most points.

Football club

Traill International school Football Club (Thai สโมสรฟุตบอลโรงเรียนเทร็ล อินเตอร์เนชั่นแนล), is a Thai football club based in Bangkok, Thailand. The club is currently playing in the 2017 Thailand Amateur League Bangkok Metropolitan Region.

References

External links
 International School Association of Thailand
CfBt

British international schools in Thailand
Educational institutions established in 1966
International schools in Bangkok
1966 establishments in Thailand